Giuliano Laezza (born 23 December 1993) is an Italian footballer who plays for  club Reggiana.

Biography
Born in Naples, Campania, Laezza started his career at Napoli.

Arzanese
In January 2012 he was signed by Serie C2 club Arzanese.

Gubbio
In July 2013 Laezza was signed by Parma for €75,000. He was immediately left for Gubbio in co-ownership deal for €200,000, in 3-year contract, along with Ferrari (for €300,000), as part of the deal that Parma signed Procacci (€200,000 in co-ownership) and Damiano (€300,000 definitive). However Gubbio also received premi di valorizzazione for the loans of Procacci (€100,000), Domini (€100,000), Moroni (€110,000), Caccavallo (€110,000), Pisseri (€110,000) and Damiano (€150,000) from Parma. Laezza made his Gubbio debut in a pre-season friendly.

In June 2014 Gubbio acquired Laezza outright for €200,000, as well as Parma bought Procacci outright for €200,000; Ferrari also returned to Parma for €200,000.

Laezza was a member of Gubbio for their 2014 pre-season camp. However, he was sold on 4 August.

Savoia
On 4 August 2014 he was signed by Savoia for undisclosed fee.

Sicula Leonzio
On 29 July 2018, he joined Sicula Leonzio in Serie C.

Avellino
On 10 August 2019, he signed with Avellino. On 21 September 2020, he suffered an ACL injury that kept him out of play for the most of the 2020–21 season. He returned to action in April 2021. On 14 July 2021, his contract with Avellino was terminated by mutual consent.

Reggiana
On 14 July 2021, he moved to Reggiana on a two-year deal.

Footnotes

References

External links
 AIC profile (data by football.it) 
 
 

Italian footballers
S.S.C. Napoli players
A.S. Gubbio 1910 players
A.C. Savoia 1908 players
A.S. Melfi players
Reggina 1914 players
A.S.D. Sicula Leonzio players
U.S. Avellino 1912 players
A.C. Reggiana 1919 players
Serie C players
Serie D players
Association football defenders
Footballers from Naples
1993 births
Living people
U.S. Agropoli 1921 players